Chou Chun-mi (born 1 November 1966) is a Taiwanese politician. She was elected to the Legislative Yuan in 2016 and served until 2022, when she took office as Magistrate of Pingtung County.

Personal life, education and early career
Chou was born on 1 November 1966, to a political family in Pingtung County. Her father, Chou Hui-huang (周輝煌), was affiliated with the Kuomintang and served on the Pingtung County Council in the 1970s. Chou obtained her bachelor's degree in law from National Taiwan University. She was a judge for seven years in the Pingtung and Kaohsiung district courts, and a lawyer for fifteen. During her legal career, Chou often provided counsel to the Democratic Progressive Party (DPP). She also represented families of people drowned in the Shuangyuan Bridge collapse caused by Typhoon Morakot in 2009.

Political career

Legislative Yuan
Chou won election to the Legislative Yuan via the Democratic Progressive Party proportional representation party list in 2016 and 2020. Chou participated in legislative questioning regarding topics related to Taiwanese indigenous people and the foreign relations of Taiwan during her first year in office. During the 2018 local elections, Chou claimed that Hsu Hsin-ying's magisterial campaign was attempting to buy votes. During the 2020 presidential election, she asserted that Kuomintang candidate Han Kuo-yu was deceiving voters regarding the source of his wealth. Over the course of her legislative tenure, Chou has opposed nuclear power, called for environmental cleanup efforts, and offered medical diplomacy to Japan during the COVID-19 pandemic.

Committee leadership
In September 2018, Chou and fellow legislator Lin Wei-chou were elected co-chairs of the Judiciary and Organic Laws and Statutes Committee. As committee co-chair, Chou expressed support for amendments to the Court Organic Act and the Administrative Court Organization Act, which permitted the establishment of collegiate grand chambers, which would lessen the possibility of courts issuing conflicting rulings. She retained the post in another election held in February 2019. The Kuomintang then boycotted a committee hearing due to the disagreement over leadership. Chou called attention to Kuomintang boycotts of bills seeking to lower the voting age to eighteen. The bill passed the legislature, but failed a referendum.

Sponsored bills
In 2018, Chou co-sponsored a national defense bill requiring government contractors to use a portion of governmental funds on defense-related research and development. In 2019, she sponsored amendments to the  introducing codified travel restrictions for persons of interest. Later that year, Chou moved for the Legal Aid Foundation to investigate and report on reasons that a majority of indigenous people unable to pay legal fees were refusing the foundation's legal aid.

Pingtung County magistracy
Chou won the DPP nomination for the Pingtung County magistracy in polls also featuring Chuang Jui-hsiung and Chung Chia-pin facing off against Su Ching-chuan. Chou was elected to office after winning the 2022 Pingtung County magistrate election held on 26 November 2022. In addition to Su, Chou faced New Power Party candidate Chan Chih-chun. During the election, SET News conflated Chou's vote count with Su's, making it seem as if Chou had lost. Su's subsequent challenge of Chou's electoral victory was dismissed by the Pingtung District Court. Following the dismissal of Su's petition, Chou took office on 25 December 2022. Chen Ching-min assumed Chou's vacant legislative seat.

References

External links

 

Living people
1966 births
21st-century Taiwanese women politicians
Members of the 9th Legislative Yuan
Members of the 10th Legislative Yuan
Magistrates of Pingtung County
Democratic Progressive Party Members of the Legislative Yuan
National Taiwan University alumni
Party List Members of the Legislative Yuan
21st-century Taiwanese lawyers
20th-century Taiwanese lawyers
Taiwanese women judges
Taiwanese women lawyers
20th-century Taiwanese judges